Bağışlı is a village in the central district of Hakkâri Province in Turkey. The village is populated by Kurds of the Pinyanişî tribe and had a population of 1,192 in 2022.

The hamlets of Akyıldız, Aşağı Kayacık, Bilgili and Budaklı are attached to Bağışlı.

Population 
Population history from 2000 to 2022:

References 

Villages in Hakkâri District
Kurdish settlements in Hakkâri Province